The Golden Helmet of Pardubice (Czech: Zlatá přilba) is a speedway competition hosted annually in Pardubice, the Czech Republic. It is the oldest motorcycle speedway race in the world and is considered prestigious. The race has been established by three motorsport enthusiasts František Hladěna, Adolf Trnka and Ladislav Polák in 1929. The first 15 events of the Golden Helmet race was held on the 2400 m long turf racetrack of Velká pardubická Steeplechase in Pardubice from 1929 to 1963. It was not rare that the race was visited by more than 100,000 fans at the time, but also 5 riders suffered mortal injuries competing on this dangerous grassy track.

Since 1964 the race has been moved on the standard flat oval cinder track of the speedway stadium in Pardubice - Svítkov. The wide track of Pardubice - Svítkov stadium enables up to six riders to compete in Golden Helmet heats.

Race Format

Exclusionary groups
Twenty four riders are divided into four exclusionary groups of six riders. Three runs are held in each exclusionary group. Riders change in individual runs according to a predetermined key starting position. Six riders together compete on the track in each single run. Three best riders advance from each exclusionary group to quarterfinal stage of the race. Two best results obtained from three runs are counted into the classification results of each individual group. The rider can skip any ride.

Quarterfinals
Quarterfinal groups consist of twelve riders advancing from the exclusion round and twelve seeded riders. They are divided again into four groups of six riders. Three quarterfinal rides take place in each group. Three best riders advance from each quarterfinal group in the semifinals.

Semifinals
Twelve riders are divided within two semifinal groups of on the basis of the results of the quarterfinal groups according to the rolling keys. Three runs in each semifinal group are held. Riders change in individual races according to a predetermined key starting position.

Finals
Riders of 1 to 3 places of semifinal groups advance to the finals to compete for Golden Helmet. Riders of 4 to 6 position then participate in small finale of 7 to 12 place in the race.

Winners

Speedway World Champions winning Golden Helmet
Below is a list of Speedway World Champions who have won also Golden Helmet of Pardubice.

Speedway World Champions starting at Golden Helmet but never winning the race
Below is a list of Speedway World Champions that have started at Golden Helmet of Pardubice race but never won the trophy.

Multiple Golden Helmet winners
Below is a list of multiple Golden Helmet winners.

Golden Helmet by Countries

References

External links

Golden helmet championships at www.speedwaychampions.com

Speedway in the Czech Republic
Speedway in Czechoslovakia
Sport in Pardubice
Recurring sporting events established in 1929
1929 establishments in Czechoslovakia